Dąbie may refer to:
Dąbie, Greater Poland Voivodeship, a town in central Poland
Dąbie, Szczecin, a neighborhood of Szczecin in northwest Poland, south of Dąbie Lake
Dąbie Lake (Jezioro Dąbie or Jezioro Dąbskie), a lake in Szczecin in the delta of the Odra river
Dąbie, part of the Grzegórzki district of Kraków
Dąbie, Legnica County in Lower Silesian Voivodeship (south-west Poland)
Dąbie, Wołów County in Lower Silesian Voivodeship (south-west Poland)
Dąbie, Inowrocław County in Kuyavian-Pomeranian Voivodeship (north-central Poland)
Dąbie, Sępólno County in Kuyavian-Pomeranian Voivodeship (north-central Poland)
Dąbie, Janów Lubelski County in Lublin Voivodeship (east Poland)
Dąbie, Krasnystaw County in Lublin Voivodeship (east Poland)
Dąbie, Gmina Bytów in Pomeranian Voivodeship (north Poland)
Dąbie, Gmina Czarna Dąbrówka in Pomeranian Voivodeship (north Poland)
Dąbie, Łęczyca County in Łódź Voivodeship (central Poland)
Dąbie, Opoczno County in Łódź Voivodeship (central Poland)
Dąbie, Wieruszów County in Łódź Voivodeship (central Poland)
Dąbie, Łuków County in Lublin Voivodeship (east Poland)
Dąbie, Lesser Poland Voivodeship (south Poland)
Dąbie, Subcarpathian Voivodeship (south-east Poland)
Dąbie, Sandomierz County in Świętokrzyskie Voivodeship (south-central Poland)
Dąbie, Gmina Włoszczowa in Świętokrzyskie Voivodeship (south-central Poland)
Dąbie, Gmina Secemin in Świętokrzyskie Voivodeship (south-central Poland)
Dąbie, Silesian Voivodeship (south Poland)
Dąbie, Lubusz Voivodeship (west Poland)
Dąbie, Warmian-Masurian Voivodeship (north Poland)
Dąbie, Gryfice County in West Pomeranian Voivodeship (north-west Poland)
Dąbie, Szczecinek County in West Pomeranian Voivodeship (north-west Poland)

See also

Dabie Mountains